Sandra Dixon Bowen (born April 13, 1941) is an American civil servant who was appointed by Virginia Governor Mark Warner to be his Secretary of Administration, a position she held from 2002 to 2006.

Life 
She graduated from the College of William & Mary, and University of Richmond.

She also served as Secretary of the Commonwealth of Virginia under Governor Gerald Baliles.

References

External links
Virginia Secretary of Administration

Living people
1941 births
State cabinet secretaries of Virginia
College of William & Mary alumni
University of Richmond alumni